Mesen (also Romanized as Masen and Mosen) is a village in Suza Rural District, Shahab District, Qeshm County, Hormozgan Province, Iran. At the 2006 census, its population was 1,623, in 352 families.

References 

Populated places in Qeshm County